District administration makes up the third level of government division in Nepal. The provision for a District Assembly, which acts as the legislature at the district-level, is mentioned in Part 17 of the Constitution of Nepal. The 77 districts of Nepal each have their own district assemblies which in turn elect their own District Coordination Committees, which serves as the executive at the district-level. In addition to this each district also has a District Administration Office which oversees the general administration of each district.

District Administration Office 
The District Administration Office is a general administration of government in each district of Nepal. The government of Nepal appoints a Chief District Officer in each district to function as a Chief Administration Officer.

The Local Administration Act, 2028 (1971) was implemented to conduct local administration in accordance with the decentralized administration system to effectively operate peace and order. Section 5 of the Local Administration Act was constituted to be a district administration office in every district to conduct general administration of the district. The DAO in each district of Nepal works under Ministry of Home Affairs. The main function of the DAO is to maintain peace, order and security in the district and provide assistance in development activities run by the federal government, provincial government, District Coordination Committee, urban municipality and rural municipality.

Chief District Officer 
The Chief District Officer (abbreviation: C.D.O.) is an administrative rank under Ministry of Home Affairs in Nepal who is appointed by the government as the senior-most executive magistrate and chief in-charge of general administration of a district . The main guideline to C.D.O. for his/her administration is the Local Administration Act, 1972. The C.D.O. is responsible for proper inspection of all the departments in a district such as health, education, security and all other government offices. In case of threatened public security conditions like riots, she/he can mobilize security forces and take other actions like imposing curfew order, fixing restricted area, arresting anyone according to law, hearing some cases as a quasi-judicial body. Distributing the Certificate of Nepalese Citizenship, processing and recommendation for passports, maintaining peace and security, law and order, acting as a representative of government, enjoying the authorities provided by more than 90 prevailing acts make a Chief District Officer powerful. The C.D.O. is the most powerful position in Nepalese administrative service. Likewise, Assistant Chief District Officers enjoys almost all the authorities as delegated by C.D.O. and other laws.

District Assembly 
The District Assembly is composed of chairpersons and vice-chairpersons of each rural municipality and mayors and deputy mayors of each municipality within a district. The District Assembly coordinates between all municipalities and rural municipalities within the district. It elects a nine-member District Coordination Committee including a chief and deputy chief and at least three women and one member from the Dalit or minority communities for a five-year term. Any member within the village or municipal assembly in local levels within the district are eligible to be elected to the District Coordination Committee and if elected their status as a local representative will lapse.

District Coordination Committee 
The District Coordination Committee (abbreviation: DCC) was formed on March 14, 2017, to replace the existing district development committee. Each of the 77 districts in Nepal have their own district coordination committees in.

The Head of a district development committee is elected by the district assembly. The government also appoints a Local Development Officer in each district development committee who heads the DCC in absence of an elected head or deputy head.

The DCC acts as an executive to the district Assembly. The DCC coordinates with the Provincial Assembly to establish coordination between the Provincial Assembly and rural municipalities and municipalities and to settle disputes, if any, of political nature. It also maintains coordination between the provincial and Federal government and among the local bodies in the district. It also monitors development within the district.

List of district coordination committees with their heads

See also 
 Gaunpalika
 List of cities in Nepal
 List of gaunpalikas of Nepal
 Village development committee
 District Development Committee

References

External links 
 Ministry of Federal Affairs and Local Development (Nepal)

Local government in Nepal
Districts of Nepal